Jules Jacques Benois Benedict (April 22, 1879 – January 16, 1948) was one of the most prominent architects in Colorado history, whose works include a number of well-known landmarks and buildings listed on the National Register of Historic Places.

Biography
Commonly known as Jacques Benedict, he was born in Chicago in 1879, and he studied architecture at the École des Beaux-Arts. He came to Denver in 1909, and became renowned for his many prominent works including homes, churches, academic and public buildings, spanning a range of architectural styles and with a particular gift for melding with natural landscapes.  Benedict married June Louise Brown in Denver on February 20, 1912, and was hired to be the architect of the Denver archdiocese of the Catholic Church, becoming a respected authority on sacred architecture.  The architect has been described by his biographer Doris Hulse, as "talented, cultured, eccentric, flamboyant, practical, difficult, opinionated, generous, temperamental, considerate, gentleman farmer, man-about-town", and a number of his works are widely known today.

Benedict died in January 1948 in a Denver hospital.

Works

Denver
1901, Park Hill Elementary School, 5050 E. 19th Ave.
1910, McDonough House, 3939 W. 46th Ave
1910, Mayer House, 4101 Mountview Blvd., National Register of Historic Places
1910, Turner-Schuyler House, 300 E. 8th Ave. (demolished)
1911, Central Savings Bank, 1108 15th St. (demolished)
1911, Sunken Gardens Pavilion, Elati St. (demolished)
1911, City Park Natural History Museum Esplanade, City Park, Denver (demolished)
1912, Ellis House, 1700 E. 3rd. Ave. National Register of Historic Places
1912, Snyder-Dorsey House, 330 Gilpin St., National Register of Historic Places
1912, Albany Hotel Annex, 16th St. and Stout St. (demolished)
1912, Huff House, 120 Humboldt St., National Register of Historic Places
1913, Roger W. Woodbury Branch Library, 3265 Federal Blvd., National Register of Historic Places
1913, Washington Park Boating Pavilion, Washington Park, National Register of Historic Places
1913, Steinhauer House, 650 Williams St.
1914, J.C. Peet House, 1717 E. Arizona Ave.
1914, Craig House, 605 E. 9th Ave.
1916, Flatiron Building, 1669 Broadway (demolished)
1917, George Cranmer House, 200 Cherry Street, National Register of Historic Places
1917, Springer-Davidson-Wilson-Wilfley House, 770 Olive St.
1919, Phipps House, 161 Race St., National Register of Historic Places
1920, Kistler-Rodriguez House, 700 E. 9th Ave., National Register of Historic Places
1920, Radetsky House, 800 Race St.
1920, Thomas-Phipps House, 360 High St., National Register of Historic Places
1920, Urling House, 4050 Montview Blvd.
pre-1921, Vali House
1921, Brown-Garrey-Congdon House, 1300 E. 7th Ave. Pkwy., National Register of Historic Places
1921, Malo Mansion, 500 E. 8th Ave., Denver Local Landmark
1922, First Church of Divine Science, 1400 Williams St., State Register
1922, James J. Waring House, 910 Gaylord St.
1922, Oberfeider House, 2701 E. 7th Ave.
1924, Levie-Leman-Bailey House, 817 Race St.
1924, Rosedale Elementary School, 2330 S. Sherman St.
1924, Holy Ghost Catholic Church, 633 19th St.
1924, Richthofen Castle (south wing), 7020 E. 12th Ave. & Olive St., National Register of Historic Places
1925, John G. and Helen Kerr House, 1900 E. 7th Ave., National Register of Historic Places
1925, Kohn House, 770 High St.
1926, St. Joseph's Catholic Church Rectory, 605 W. 6th St.
1926, Richard C. Campbell House, 909 York St., National Register of Historic Places
1926, Salzer House, 801 Race St.
1926, Cullen Thompson Motor Co./Chrysler Building/Gart Sports, 1000 Broadway
1926-31, St. Thomas Theological Main Seminary Buildings, now Saint John Vianney Theological Seminary, 1330 S. Steele St., National Register of Historic Places
1927, McFarland House, 476 Westwood Dr., National Register of Historic Places
1927, Geddes House, 2155 Hawthorne Pl., National Register of Historic Places
1927, Herres House, E. 6th Ave. and York St. (demolished)
1927, Fitzell House, 2900 E. 7th Ave. Pkwy.
1928, Graland School, E. 1st Ave. (demolished)
1928, St. Andrews Episcopal Church Clergy House, 2013 Glenarm St., National Register of Historic Places
ca 1928, Evans House Terrace and Stairway, 2001 E. Alameda Ave. (demolished)
1929, Douglas House, 576 Circle Dr., National Register of Historic Places
1930-33, Weckbaugh House also known as Willbank House, 1701 E. Cedar Ave., National Register of Historic Places
1932, Arthur House, 355 Gilpin St., National Register of Historic Places
1932, Benedict Fountain, E. 20th Ave. and Court Place
1932, Hungarian Freedom Park Fountain (Children's Fountain), Speer Blvd. and Clarkson St., moved here from Belmar c. 1971, National Register of Historic Places
1935, Colorado Building/Hayden, Dickinson & Feldhauser Building, 1609-1615 California St., 1935
1936, St. Elizabeth's Catholic Church Cloisters, Prayer Garden & Monastery, 1060 11th St., National Register of Historic Places
Highland Park, roughly bounded by Highland Park Place, Federal Boulevard, and Fairview Place, NRHP-listed

Elsewhere
1911, Walker House, Mt. Falcon, Morrison vicinity, Jefferson (ruins)
1911, Summer Home for the Presidents of the United States, Mt. Falcon Park, Morrison vicinity, Jefferson (ruins)
1912, Wyldemere Farm (now Carmelite Convent), 6138 S. Gallup St., Littleton, Arapahoe
1914, Denison Arts and Sciences, University of Colorado at Boulder
1915, Bergen Park Pavilion, CO Hwy. 74, Evergreen vicinity, Jefferson National Register of Historic Places
1917, Chief Hosa Lodge and Picnic Shelter, 26771 Genesee Ln., Golden vicinity, Jefferson National Register of Historic Places
1917, Littleton Carnegie Library, 2707 W. Main St., Littleton
1918, Filius Park Shelter & Pumphouse, CO Hwy 74, Evergreen vicinity, Jefferson, National Register of Historic Places
1919, Herman Coors House, 1817 Arapahoe St., Golden, Jefferson, National Register of Historic Places
1920, Littleton Town Hall and Fire Department, 2450 W. Main St., Littleton, Arapahoe, National Register of Historic Places
1920, Paul T. Mayo Lodge, 32743 Upper Bear Creek Road, Evergreen vicinity, Jefferson
1920, Rosedale, Evergreen, Colorado
1920s, Genesee Ski Club, Genesee, Golden vicinity, Jefferson (demolished)
pre-1922, Waring Lodge, Bear Creek Canyon, Evergreen, Jefferson
pre-1922, Phelan Cabin, Colorow Point, Lookout Mountain, Golden vicinity, Jefferson
1922, Daniels Park Picnic Shelter, County Rd. 67, Sedalia vicinity, Douglas, National Register of Historic Places
ca 1923, Starbuck Park Well House, CO Hwy 74, Idledale vicinity, Jefferson, National Register of Historic Places
1925, Dedisse Park Clubhouse also known as Keys on the Green, 29614 Upper Bear Creek Rd., Evergreen vicinity, Jefferson, National Register of Historic Places
1926, Echo Lake Lodge, CO Hwy 103 & 5, Idaho Springs vicinity, Clear Creek, National Register of Historic Places
1928, Baehr Lodge/Baehr Den of the Rockies (Pine Valley Lodge), 16405 CO Hwy. 126, Pine vicinity, Jefferson, State Register
1928, Ponderosa Lodge also known as La Foret (Taylor Summer Cabin), 6145 Shoup Road, Black Forest, northeast of Colorado Springs, El Paso, National Register of Historic Places
1928, Sparey House, Broadmoor area, Colorado Springs, El Paso
1928, Herman Coors Gardner's House, 810 19th St., Golden
1929, First Presbyterian Church, 1609 W. Littleton Blvd., Littleton, Arapahoe
1931, Ingersoll House, 4 Pourtales Rd., Colorado Springs, El Paso
1932, Highlands Ranch Headquarters, 9900 S. Ranch Rd., Highlands Ranch, Douglas
mid-1930s, Little Park Well House, CO Hwy 74, Idledale, Jefferson, National Register of Historic Places
mid-1930s, Summit Lake Park Shelter, Mt. Evans Rd., Idaho Springs vicinity, National Register of Historic Places
1935, St. Catherine's Chapel at Camp St. Malo, CO Hwy. 7, Allenspark vicinity
1936, Belmar/Mary Bonfils Berryman Estate, replica of Petit Trianon palace in Versailles, for May Bonfils Stanton, 769 S. Wadsworth Blvd., Lakewood, Jefferson (demolished)
1937, Colorado School of Mines Field House also known as Steinhauer Field House, Illinois and 13th Sts., Golden, Jefferson, also designed Colorado School of Mines emblem

Gallery

References

Further reading
Littleton Biography of Jacques Benedict
Denver Catholic Archdiocese Article
Buildings of Colorado by Thomas J. Noel

External links

Bibliographic notes and plans for the J. G. Kerr house are available at Denver Public Library
Benedict information and photos at Historic American Buildings Survey
Benedict nomination, Colorado State Register
List of Benedict's buildings at Architects of Colorado

20th-century American architects
Architects from Colorado
Colorado School of Mines
1879 births
1948 deaths
Architects from Chicago
People from Denver
American alumni of the École des Beaux-Arts